Tullaroan is a village in the western part of County Kilkenny in the Slieveardagh Hills near the Tipperary border. Tullaroan is also the name of the local civil parish.

Sport
Tullaroan GAA are the most successful Gaelic Athletic Association club in County Kilkenny, having won the Kilkenny Senior Hurling Championship title twenty times, and have been finalists on eleven occasions.

Culture 
The most common surnames in Tullaroan in 1849-50 were Grace, Maher, Kelly, Walsh, Dunne, Connors, Dowling, Kavanagh, Fogarty and Comerford.

Geography 
Civil parishes adjoining Tullaroan parish include Ballingarry (Slieveardagh) in County Tipperary and in County Kilkenny Ballinamara, Ballycallan, Ballylarkin, Killahy (Crannagh), Kilmanagh, Tubbridbritain.

See also 
 Tullaroan Church

References

Further reading

External links 
 Tullaroan GAA Club

Towns and villages in County Kilkenny